Wilderness is the ninth studio album by The Handsome Family. It was released in May 2013 by Carrot Top Records. Wilderness is an often surreal concept album about nature, with each song named after an animal.

Reception
The album was well received by critics: according to Metacritic, the album has received an average review score of 76/100, based on 9 reviews, indicating "generally favorable reviews." James Monger of AllMusic noted the album's Kafkaesque, dreamlike quality, praising the "remarkably affecting" song "Wildebeest," about the death of 19th-century songwriter Stephen Foster. A.V. Club reviewer Christopher Bahn described Wilderness as "one of the strongest, most cohesive albums of their career."

Track list

References

2013 albums
The Handsome Family albums
Carrot Top Records albums
Loose Music albums